Jim Wright (born December 12, 1935) is a former American football player and coach.  He served as the head football coach at Wichita State University from 1974 to 1978, compiling a record of 17–37–1.  Wright was born on December 12, 1935 in Edinburg, Texas. He played college football as a quarterback at Texas A&M University from 1954 to 1957. Prior to becoming head coach at Wichita State, Wright worked as an assistant football coach at Texas Tech University from 1961 to 1966, at Mississippi State University from 1967 to 1969, and at the University of Tennessee from 1970 to 1973.

Head coaching record

References

1935 births
Living people
American football quarterbacks
Mississippi State Bulldogs football coaches
Texas A&M Aggies football players
Tennessee Volunteers football coaches
Texas Tech Red Raiders football coaches
Wichita State Shockers football coaches
People from Edinburg, Texas
Coaches of American football from Texas
Players of American football from Texas